Ferruginibacter alkalilentus is a Gram-negative and rod-shaped bacterium from the genus of Ferruginibacter which has been isolated from freshwater sediments.

References

External links
Type strain of Ferruginibacter alkalilentus at BacDive -  the Bacterial Diversity Metadatabase

Chitinophagia
Bacteria described in 2009